Ahaana Krishna (born 13 October 1995) is an Indian actress, who appears primarily in Malayalam films and in ad films. She made her cinematic debut as lead heroine in Rajeev Ravi's Njan Steve Lopez in 2014.

Early life 
Ahaana was born as the eldest of the four daughters of actor Krishna Kumar and wife Sindhu Krishna. She studied at Holy Angels' I.S.C School, Thiruvananthapuram then she moved to Chennai for completing her higher studies in Visual Communication from MOP Vaishnav college for Women. She completed an Online Post Graduate Certificate Programme in Advertising Management and Public Relations from MICA, Ahmedabad.

Career 
While she was still in school, she was offered the female lead roles in Annayum Rasoolum (2013) and a Dulquer Salmaan film, which she turned down. Ahaana made her acting debut in 2014 with Rajeev Ravi's second directorial film Njan Steve Lopez. She then appeared in Njandukalude Nattil Oridavela in 2017 directed by Althaf with Nivin Pauly.

In 2019 Ahaana starred in the romantic drama Luca along with Tovino Thomas. The film was a critical and commercial success, with praise directed to the performances of the leading actors which established her as a strong performer. The same year, she also appeared in Shanker Ramakrishnan's Pathinettam Padi.

Filmography

Web series

Discography

Music videos

Television

References

External links 
 

Living people
Actresses in Malayalam cinema
Indian film actresses
Place of birth missing (living people)
1995 births
Actresses from Thiruvananthapuram
21st-century Indian actresses